Tristeza may refer to:
Tristeza, Rio Grande do Sul
Cerro Tristeza, Mt Tristeza
Tristeza (virus), citrus virus
Tristeza (band), American instrumental band
"Tristeza", 1966 instrumental by Lobo and Nitinho, song version covered by Sérgio Mendes on Look Around
Tristeza, album and title track by Baden Powell (guitarist) 1976